TD-2 was a microwave relay that carried long-distance telephone in the US and Canada.

TD2 or TD-2 may also refer to:
 Taepodong-2, North Korean space launcher technology
 TD-2 RNA motif, a conserved RNA structure and metagenome sequences
 Yamaha TD2, motorcycle model

See also